Viktoria Dimitrova (11 June 1976 – 8 November 1994) was a Bulgarian figure skater. She represented Bulgaria at two European Championships, three World Championships, and the 1992 Winter Olympics in Albertville. She died suddenly at age 18.

Competitive highlights

References 

1976 births
1994 deaths
Bulgarian female single skaters
Figure skaters at the 1992 Winter Olympics
Olympic figure skaters of Bulgaria